Alistair John Dick (born 25 April 1965) is a Scottish former professional footballer who played in the position of midfielder for clubs including Tottenham Hotspur in England and Ajax in the Netherlands. He later went on to play in South Africa and Australia. Dick also represented Scotland at schoolboy and youth level.

Football career
Having come to wide attention with his performances for Scotland Schoolboys in 1980, Dick joined Tottenham Hotspur as an apprentice and played in 17 league matches and scored two goals between 1981 and 1986. He had the distinction of becoming the youngest first team player in Spurs' history up to that time, appearing at the age of 16 years and 301 days when he made his debut at White Hart Lane against Manchester City on 20 February 1982. Although John Bostock broke the record as a substitute in 2008, Dick remains the youngest to have started a match. One of the highlights of his Spurs spell was an appearance as a substitute in the second leg of the 1984 UEFA Cup Final at White Hart Lane, with several more experienced squad members unavailable through injury or suspension; however, he was himself injured during the match but played on, with the problem (torn knee ligaments) requiring an operation and causing him problems later in his career.

Johan Cruijff signed Dick for Ajax in 1986, having been alerted to his talents by Scottish club Rangers, who had decided against bringing him to Glasgow in what would have been a notable departure from their 'no catholics' signing policy of the time, but recommended him as an option to Ajax when the Dutch club enquired about Davie Cooper and media reporting on the player failed to mention his name and focused only his religion. Part of a hugely talented Ajax squad which included Dennis Bergkamp, Aron Winter, Frank Rijkaard and Marco van Basten, Dick initially held down a place in the team but at the end of 1986 was badly injured in a European Cup Winners' Cup match against Olympiacos. Having missed the rest of the season, he featured again in the next European campaign, including playing against FC Porto in the first leg of the 1987 European Super Cup at its start, and being an unused sub in the 1988 European Cup Winners' Cup Final defeat against Belgian club KV Mechelen at its end, but the injuries had cost him the pace that was a large part of his playing style, and he fell out of favour. Dick later reflected that he had not found Cruijff's managerial style beneficial due to the contrast in their personalities, but that he could have done more in approaching the manager for guidance when he had the opportunity.

Following short periods at Wimbledon and Brighton without making any League appearances for either, he went on to play in Australia for clubs including Heidelberg, winning the National League Cup in 1992, and also for Seven Stars (now Ajax Cape Town) in South Africa before injury ended his career at Scottish club Alloa Athletic in 1997 at the age of 32.

After football
Dick worked for Associated Newspapers (Daily Mail & Mail on Sunday). He also holds a UEFA 'B' coaching licence. In 2011, he was appointed as one of the head coaches in Stirling Albion's youth academy, and also worked as a coach at Stirling University.

Honours

Club
Tottenham Hotspur
UEFA Cup: 1984

Ajax
UEFA Cup Winners' Cup: Runner-up 1988
UEFA Super Cup: Runner-up 1987

Scotland Youth 
 UEFA European Under-18 Championship: 1982

References

External links
Tottenham Hotspur A-Z of players
RSSF 1982 UEFA European Under-18 Championships

1965 births
Living people
Scottish footballers
Scotland youth international footballers
Tottenham Hotspur F.C. players
AFC Ajax players
Alloa Athletic F.C. players
Academics of the University of Stirling
English Football League players
Eredivisie players
National Soccer League (Australia) players
National First Division players
Footballers from Stirling
Association football coaches
UEFA Cup winning players
Association football midfielders
Gippsland Falcons players
Frankston Pines F.C. players
Cape Town Spurs F.C. players
Heidelberg United FC players
Scottish expatriate footballers
Scottish expatriate sportspeople in the Netherlands
Expatriate footballers in the Netherlands
Scottish expatriate sportspeople in South Africa
Expatriate soccer players in South Africa
Scottish expatriate sportspeople in Australia
Expatriate soccer players in Australia
People educated at St Modan's High School